Chlenias banksiaria is a moth of the family Geometridae first described by Élie Jean François Le Guillou in 1841. It is found in the Australian Capital Territory, New South Wales, Victoria and Tasmania.

The larvae feed from many species of unrelated plants, including the introduced Pinus radiata.

References

Moths of Australia
Ennominae
Moths described in 1841